The 2022 Liga 3 Papua is the fifth edition of the Liga 3 Zone Papua Province organized by Asprov PSSI Papua.

Followed by 8 clubs. The winner of this competition will immediately advance to the national round without passing the regional round Papua representing Papua Province to get promoted to Liga 2.

Toli is the defending champion after winning it in the 2021 season.

Teams
League 3 Papua this season was attended by 7 teams from 3 provinces, namely Papua and the three provinces resulting from their separated. The following is a list of participating teams;

Venues 
Mandala Stadium, Jayapura
Mahandra Uncen Stadium, Jayapura
Barnabas Youwe Stadium, Jayapura Regency

Group stage

See also 
2022 Liga 3 West Papua

References 

Liga 3
Liga 3 (Indonesia)
Sport in Papua (province)